Tiger General  Hǔjiàng) is a Sinosphere idiom referencing particularly successful generals or successful figures in any similarly competitive field.

In particular, it may refer to:

 Five Tiger Generals, various groups of legendary and historical generals
 Five Tiger Generals of TVB, five successful actors of 1980s Hong Kong television

See also
 Tiger tally, the imperial symbol of a general officer's authorization
 The Tiger General, a novel about a Vietnamese officer
 Tigers in Chinese culture